In human genetics, Haplogroup O-M119 is a Y-chromosome DNA haplogroup. Haplogroup O-M119 is a descendant branch of haplogroup O-F265 also known as O1a, one of two extant primary subclades of Haplogroup O-M175. The same clade previously has been labeled as O-MSY2.2.

Origins
The Haplogroup O-M119 branch is believed to have evolved during the Late Pleistocene (Upper Paleolithic) in China mainland.

Paleolithic migrations
 suggest haplogroup O-M119 was part of a four-phase colonization model in which Paleolithic migrations of hunter-gatherers shaped the primary structure of current Y-Chromosome diversity of Maritime Southeast Asia.  Approximately 5000 BCE, Haplogroup O-M119 coalesced at Sundaland and migrated northwards to as far as Taiwan, where O-M50 constitutes some 90% of the Aboriginal Y-DNA, being the main haplogroup that can be directly linked to the Austronesian expansion in phase 3.

Taiwan homeland
 concluded that in contrast to the Taiwan homeland hypothesis, Island Southeast Asians do not have a Taiwan origin based on their paternal lineages. According to their results, lineages within Maritime Southeast Asia did not originate from Taiwanese aborigines as linguistic studies suggest. Taiwan aborigines and Indonesians were likely to have been derived from the Tai–Kadai-speaking populations based on their paternal lineages, and thereafter evolved independently of each other.

The strongest positive correlation between Haplogroup O-M119 and ethno-linguistic affiliation is that which is observed between this haplogroup and the Austronesians. The peak frequency of Haplogroup O-M119 is found among the aborigines of Taiwan, precisely the region from which linguists have hypothesized that the Austronesian language family originated. A slightly weaker correlation is observed between Haplogroup O-M119 and the Han Chinese populations of southern China, as well as between this haplogroup and the Tai–Kadai-speaking populations of southern China and Southeast Asia. The distribution of Tai–Kadai languages in Thailand and other parts of Southeast Asia outside of China has long been believed, for reasons of traditional linguistic geography, to reflect a recent invasion of Southeast Asia by Tai–Kadai-speaking populations originating from southeastern China, and the somewhat elevated frequency of Haplogroup O-M119 among the Tai–Kadai populations, coupled with a high frequency of Haplogroup O-M95, which is a genetic characteristic of the Austroasiatic-speaking peoples of Southeast Asia, suggests that the genetic signature of the Tai–Kadai peoples' affinity with populations of southeastern China has been weakened due to extensive assimilation of the earlier Austroasiatic residents of the lands which the Tai–Kadai peoples invaded.

Distribution
Haplogroup O-M119 lineages are found primarily in Southeast Asian populations of Malaysia, Vietnam, Indonesia, the Philippines, southern China and Taiwan . High frequencies of this haplogroup have been found in populations spread in an arc through southeastern China, Taiwan, the Philippines, and Indonesia. It has been found with generally lower frequency in samples from Oceania, mainland Southeast Asia, Southwest China, Northwest China, North China, Northeast China, Korea, Japan, North Asia, and Central Asia.

A 2008 study by Li suggested that the admixture analyses of Tai–Kadai-speaking populations showed a significant genetic influence in a large proportion of Indonesians. Most of the population samples contained a high frequency of haplogroup O-M119 .

The frequencies of Haplogroup O-M119 among various East Asian and Austronesian populations suggest a complex genetic history of the modern Han populations of southern China. Although Haplogroup O-M119 occurs only at an average frequency of approximately 4% among Han populations of northern China and peoples of southwestern China and Southeast Asia who speak Tibeto-Burman languages, the frequency of this haplogroup among the Han populations of southern China nearly quadruples to about 15-23%. The frequency of Haplogroup O-M119 among the Southern Han has been found to be slightly greater than the arithmetic mean of the frequencies of Haplogroup O-M119 among the Northern Han and a pooled sample of Austronesian populations. This suggests that modern Southern Han populations may possess a non-trivial number of male ancestors who were originally affiliated with some Austronesian-related culture, or who at least shared some genetic affinity with many of the ancestors of modern Austronesian peoples.

Subclade distribution

O-M119
This lineage is found frequently in Austronesians, southern Han Chinese, and Kra-Dai peoples. This lineage is presumed to be a marker of the prehistoric Austronesian expansion, with possible origins encompassing the regions along the southeastern coast of China and neighboring Taiwan, and is found among modern populations of Maritime Southeast Asia and Oceania .

Haplogroup O-M119 Y-chromosomes also have been found to occur at low frequency among various populations of Siberia, such as the Nivkhs (one of 17 sampled Y-chromosomes), Ulchi/Nanai (2/53), Yenisey Evenks (1/31), and especially the Buryats living in the Sayan-Baikal uplands of Irkutsk Oblast (6/13) .

O-P203
O-P203 was found in 86.7% (52/60) of a sample from Nias, 70.8% (34/48) of Taiwanese Aboriginals, 28.4% (21/74) of Mentawai, 11.4% (73/641) of Balinese, 9.8% (6/61) of a sample from Java, 9.1% (36/394) of a sample from Flores, 9.1% (15/165) of Han Chinese, 8.3% (1/12) of a sample from Western Samoa, 8.2% (4/49) of Tujia from Hunan, 6.9% (4/58) of Miao from China, 5.7% (4/70) of Vietnamese, 3.3% (1/30) of a sample from the Moluccas, 3.1% (1/32) of Malaysians, 3.0% (1/33) of a sample from highland Papua New Guinea, 2.6% (1/38) of a sample from Sumatra, 2.3% (2/86) of a sample from Borneo, 2.1% (1/48) of Filipinos, 2.0% (1/51) of She, 1.7% (1/60) of Yao from Guangxi, 1.1% (1/92) of a sample from Lembata, and 0.9% (3/350) of a sample from Sumba.

In a study published in 2011, O-P203 was observed in 22.2% (37/167) of Han Chinese male volunteers at Fudan University in
Shanghai whose origin may be traced back to East China (Jiangsu, Zhejiang, Shanghai, or Anhui), 12.3% (8/65) of Han Chinese male volunteers whose origin may be traced back to South China, and 1.6% (2/129) of Han Chinese male volunteers whose origin may be traced back to North China.

O-M101
This lineage was observed in one individual from China  and another from Kota Kinabalu .

O-M50
This lineage occurs among Austronesian peoples of Taiwan, the Philippines, Indonesia, Melanesia, Micronesia, and Madagascar as well as among some populations of continental Southeast Asia and among Bantu peoples of the Comoros. It also has been found in a Hawaiian.

A study published in 2005 found O-M50 in 33.3% (13/39) of a sample of aboriginals in Taiwan, 18.2% (2/11) of a sample of people in Majuro, 17.1% (6/35) of a sample of Malagasy, 9.2% (6/65) of a sample of people in Kota Kinabalu, 9.1% (2/22) of a sample of people in Banjarmasin, 3.6% (1/28) of a sample of people in the Philippines, and 1.9% (1/52) of a sample of people in Vanuatu.

Kayser et al. 2008 found O-M110 in 34.1% (14/41) of a sample of Taiwan Aborigines, 17.7% (26/147) of a sample from the Admiralty Islands, 17.3% (9/52) of a sample from the Trobriand Islands, 13.5% (5/37) of a sample from the Philippines, 9.7% (3/31) of a sample from the Nusa Tenggara Islands, 3.8% (2/53) of a sample from Java, 3.0% (1/33) of a sample from the Moluccas, 2.5% (1/40) of a sample from Borneo, 1.0% (1/100) of a sample from Tuvalu, and 0.95% (1/105) of a sample from Fiji.

A study published in 2010 found O-M110 in 18.8% (9/48) Taiwanese Aboriginals, 13.3% (8/60) Nias, 8.3% (4/48) Philippines, 7.4% (4/54) Sulawesi, 6.3% (22/350) Sumba, 5.8% (5/86) Borneo, 3.3% (1/30) Moluccas, 2.3% (1/44) Maewo, Vanuatu, 1.6% (1/61) Java, 1.4% (1/74) Mentawai, and 0.8% (5/641) Bali.

A study published in 2012 found O-M110 in 4.6% (33/712) of males from the Solomon Islands.

Phylogenetics

Phylogenetic history

Prior to 2002, there were in academic literature at least seven naming systems for the Y-Chromosome Phylogenetic tree. This led to considerable confusion. In 2002, the major research groups came together and formed the Y-Chromosome Consortium (YCC). They published a joint paper that created a single new tree that all agreed to use. Later, a group of citizen scientists with an interest in population genetics and genetic genealogy formed a working group to create an amateur tree aiming at being above all timely. The table below brings together all of these works at the point of the landmark 2002 YCC Tree. This allows a researcher reviewing older published literature to quickly move between nomenclatures.

Research publications
The following research teams per their publications were represented in the creation of the YCC tree.

Phylogenetic trees
This phylogenetic tree of haplogroup O subclades is based on the YCC 2008 tree  and subsequent published research.
O-M119
O-M119* China (Sichuan, Guizhou, Hubei, Shanghai, Zhejiang, Guangdong, Henan, Hebei, Liaoning, etc.)
O-Y14027
O1a3-Y144065/F1036 China (esp. Zhejiang, Fujian, Jiangsu, and Guangdong)
O-Y87942/MF38142 China (Zhejiang, Jiangsu, Sichuan, Chongqing, Hubei, etc.)
O-F1009 China (Shandong, Jiangsu, Hebei, Zhejiang, Beijing, Liaoning, Henan, Shanghai, Guangdong, Anhui, Shanxi, Jilin, Sichuan, Heilongjiang, Tianjin, Hubei, Shaanxi, Hunan, Gansu, etc.), North Korea (Pyeongyang), South Korea
O1a2-M50/M103/M110/F3288 Austronesia, China (Beijing, Macau), Thailand (Tai Lue, Yong, Tai Dam from Loei Province, Iu Mien, Isan, Mon, Siamese, Khon Muang), Laos (Lao from Luang Prabang)
O1a2a (F3288)
O1a2a1 (B392, Z38606, Z38607, Z38608, Z38609, Z38610, Z38611)
O1a2a1a (B393, Z38612)
O1a1-B384/Z23193
O1a1a (M307.1/P203.1, CTS3422, CTS4351, CTS5059, CTS6864, CTS7015, CTS8229, CTS8875, CTS8934, CTS9321, CTS11688, F31, F54, F89, F303, F333, L83)
O1a1a1 (F446, CTS4588, F560, FGC15381/K620/Z23389, K613/Z23387, K619/Z23388)
O1a1a1a (F140, CTS611, CTS3089, CTS3265, CTS3269, CTS11270, F157, F343, F424, F518, F571, FGC15382/Z23466, FGC15391/Y14275/Z23470, FGC15383/K625/Z23474, V68.2, Z23457)
O1a1a1a* Indonesia
O1a1a1a1 (F78, CTS4478) China (esp. Shanghai, Jiangsu, Zhejiang)
O-F23879 Philippines (Igorot from Mountain Province, Negros Occidental) 
O-MF14277 China (Hunan, Sichuan, Guizhou, Jiangxi, Guangdong, Hubei, etc.)
O-MF14175 China (esp. Hunan, Sichuan, and Chongqing)
O-Y158653/ACT6252 China (Hebei, Jiangxi, Ma'anshan)
O1a1a1a1a (F81, CTS4910, CTS5709, FGC15392/Y14265/Z23469) China, Philippines, Vietnam (Pathen from Quang Bình District, Tày from Mường Khương District and Cư Jút District, Dao from Hoàng Su Phì District), Thailand (Pray, Isan, Mon, Central Thai, Northern Thai)
O1a1a1a1a* Guangdong
O1a1a1a1a1 (CTS2458)
O1a1a1a1a1a (F533)
O1a1a1a1a1a1 (F492, CTS2498, CTS2594, CTS4206,CTS5075, CTS11784, F619, K629/Z23478)
O1a1a1a1a1a1a (F656, Z23481) Hubei, Jiangsu, Hong Kong, Beijing, Xishuangbanna 
O1a1a1a1a1a1a1 (A12440) Jiangsu, Anhui
O1a1a1a1a1a1a1a (A12439)
O1a1a1a1a1a1a2 (A14788, A14789)
O1a1a1a1a1a1a3 (F65, F285, F469)
O1a1a1a1a1a1a4 (MF1068, MF1069, MF1070)
O1a1a1a1a1a1a5 (Z23482, Z23484, Z23485, Z23486, Z23487, Z23488, Z23489)
O1a1a1a1a1a1b (FGC66168, Z23496, Z23505) Guangdong, Guangxi, Jiangsu
O1a1a1a1a1a1b1 (CTS11553, Z23494, Z23496, Z23503)
O1a1a1a1a1a1b2 (CTS409, CTS2613, CTS5922) Fujian
O1a1a1a1a1a1b3 (Y146786, Y146790, Y146817) Hubei, Jiangxi
O1a1a1a1a1a1c (Y31266, Y31267)
O1a1a1a1a1a1c* Jiangxi, Fujian
O1a1a1a1a1a1c1 (Y31261, Y31262, Y31263, Y31264, Y31265, Y31643) Sichuan, Cambodia
O1a1a1a1a1a1d (A12441, A12442, A12443, Y69066) Henan, Anhui  
O1a1a1a1a1a1e (MF1071, MF1072, MF1073) Jiangsu, Anhui
O1a1a1a1a1a1e1 (MF1074)
O1a1a1a1a1a2 (CTS4585, CTS7624, FGC15395/Y14269, FGC15397/Y14272, FGC15398/Y13987, FGC15399/Y13986, FGC15400/Y13989, FGC15401/Y13988, FGC15402/Y13984, FGC15409/Y13985, FGC47328, FGC47336, Y14273) Jiangsu, Beijing
O1a1a1a1a2 (MF1075, MF1076, MF1077, MF1078, MF1079, MF1080, MF1081, MF1082) Jiangsu, Shanghai
O1a1a1a2 (YP4610/Z39229)
O1a1a1a2a (AM00330/AMM480/B386, SK1533, Z39230/YP4600, Z39231/YP4601, Z39232/YP4603, Z39233/YP4605, Z39234/YP4607, Z39235/YP4609, Z39236/YP4611, Z39237/YP4612, Z39238/YP4613, Z39239/YP4614, Z39240/YP4615, Z39241/YP4616, Z39242/YP4617, Z39243/YP4618, Z39244/YP4619, Z39245/YP4620, Z39246/YP4621)
O1a1a1a2a1 (AM00333/AMM483/B387, Z39247/YP4602) Philippines, Singapore (Malay)
O1a1a1a2a1a (B388, Z39248/YP4604, Z39249/YP4608) Philippines, Singapore (Malay)
O1a1a1a2b (SK1555)
O1a1a1b (SK1568/Z23420, CTS8920, Z23430)
O1a1a1b1 (M101) China (Guizhou), Thailand (Phuan from Central Thailand), Kota Kinabalu
O1a1a1b2 (Z23392, Z23404, Z23440/SK1572) Vietnam (Colao from Hoàng Su Phì District), Thailand (Phutai from Sakon Nakhon Province, Siamese from Western Thailand and Eastern Thailand, Mon from Northern Thailand)
O1a1a1b2* Ho Chi Minh City
O1a1a1b2a (Z23442, F26575) Xishuangbanna, Hong Kong, Ho Chi Minh City
O1a1a1b2a1 (SK1571, Z39268)
O1a1a2 (CTS8423, CTS2915, F4084) China (Jiangsu, Shanghai, Zhejiang, Hubei, Sichuan, etc.)
O1a1a2a (CTS52, CTS11785, CTS5880) Japan
O1a1a2a1 (CTS701, K583, CTS4115, CTS6217) Vietnam (Lachi and Dao from Hoàng Su Phì District, Hanhi and Sila from Mường Tè District, Hmong from Điện Biên Phủ, Tay from Bình Liêu District), Thailand (Tai Lue from Northern Thailand, Shan, Suay from Northeast Thailand, Skaw Karen from Mae Hong Son Province, Isan, Phuan from Central Thailand, Black Tai from Loei Province, Mon, Northern Thai), Laos (Lao from Vientiane)
O1a1a2a1a (K644/Z23266, Z23269) 
O1a1a2a1a1 (CTS10805, MF2376, CTS4829)
O-CTS10805* Hunan
O-Y148878 Guangdong, Sichuan
O-MF2375
O-MF2375* Hunan, Beijing
O-MF6454 Singapore, Indonesia (Greater Jakarta)
O1a1a2a1a2 (Z23274, Z23275, F24990, F25139)
O-Z23274* Shandong
O-YP345 (Z7773, Z23304/Z23304.2) Xishuangbanna Dai
O-Z23338/Y18196 Xishuangbanna Dai
O1a1a2a1a3 (CTS9421, CTS3144, CTS9476) China (Fujian Han), Singapore, Japan
O1a1a2a1a4 (Y168496, MF167165/Y192368, Y168556, Y168502) China (Jiangsu)
O1a1a2a1b (Y157651)
O-Y156772 Shandong
O-CTS2118
O-CTS2118* Singapore
O-F16334 (CTS11040, CTS1992) Beijing, Guangdong, Liaoning
O1a1a2a2 (Y89818, MF16617)
O1a1a2a2a (MF14481, MF17536, MF16199) Zhejiang, Shandong
O1a1a2a2b (FGC66100, FGC66137, FGC66127) Hubei, Jiangxi, Zhejiang, Hebei, North Korea
O1a1a2b (F2444, F4243, Y137046) China (Guangdong, Jiangsu, Sichuan, Hubei, Zhejiang, Shandong, Jiangxi, etc.)
O1a1a2b1-Y137055 China (Found sporadically in Shandong, Hebei, Hong Kong, Hubei, Zhejiang, etc.)
O-Y137185 China (Guangdong, Sichuan, Jiangsu, Hubei, Shanghai, etc.), Hungary (Győr-Moson-Sopron)
O1a1a2b2-MF6180 China (Found sporadically in Shaanxi, Henan, Liaoning, Jilin, Heilongjiang, Shanxi), South Korea
O-F1056 China (Jiangsu, Shanghai, Zhejiang, Shandong, Anhui, etc.)
O-MF6458 China (esp. Jiangsu, Shanghai, Zhejiang)
O-MF6284 China (Found sporadically in Jiangsu, Shanghai, Henan, Sichuan)
O1a1a2c-SK1522 China (Jiangsu, Zhejiang, Shanghai, etc.)O1a1b (CTS5726, CTS3085, CTS3400) China (Beijing, Fujian), Thailand (Siamese from Western Thailand), the Philippines (Manila, Agta), Singapore (Malay)''

See also
Austro-Tai languages

Genetics

Y-DNA O subclades

Proportion of O-M119 in various samples

Y-DNA backbone tree

References

Footnotes

Works cited
Journals

Websites

Sources for conversion tables

 
 

 
 

 
 
 

O-MSY2.2